Deinostigma eberhardtii is a species of flowering plant in the family Gesneriaceae native to Vietnam.

It was first described as Chirita eberhardtii in 1926 by François Pellegrin, and was moved to the genus, Deinostigma, in 2016 by Möller and others.

References

eberhardtii